
Gmina Drezdenko is an urban-rural gmina (administrative district) in Strzelce-Drezdenko County, Lubusz Voivodeship, in western Poland.

Villages
Apart from the town of Drezdenko, Gmina Drezdenko contains the villages and settlements of Bagniewo, Czartowo, Drawiny, Duraczewo, Górzyska, Gościm, Goszczanowiec, Goszczanówko, Goszczanowo, Grotów, Hutniki, Jeleń, Karwin, Kijów, Klesno, Kosin, Lipno, Lipowo, Lubiatów, Lubiewo, Marzenin, Modropole, Niegosław, Osów, Przeborowo, Rąpin, Stare Bielice, Trzebicz, Trzebicz Nowy, Trzebicz-Młyn, Tuczępy, Zagórze and Zielątkowo.

Neighbouring gminas
Gmina Drezdenko is bordered by the gminas of Dobiegniew, Drawsko, Krzyż Wielkopolski, Międzychód, Santok, Sieraków, Skwierzyna, Stare Kurowo and Zwierzyn.

Twin towns – sister cities

Gmina Drezdenko is twinned with:
 Winsen, Germany

References

Drezdenko
Strzelce-Drezdenko County